Zhelnino is an urban locality (a work settlement) under the administrative jurisdiction of the city of oblast significance of Dzerzhinsk in Nizhny Novgorod Oblast, Russia, located  west of Nizhny Novgorod and  southwest of Dzerzhinsk. Population:

References

Urban-type settlements in Nizhny Novgorod Oblast
Dzerzhinsk Urban Okrug